Ruslan Novoseltsev (born 30 June 1974) is a Russian former competitive figure skater. He is the 1997 Winter Universiade champion and 1995 Finlandia Trophy bronze medalist.

After retiring from competition, Novoseltsev performed for the Imperial Ice Stars. He also works as a coach in Finland.

Competitive highlights 
GP: ISU Champions Series (Grand Prix)

References 

1974 births
Russian male single skaters
Living people
Figure skaters from Saint Petersburg
Universiade medalists in figure skating
Universiade gold medalists for Russia
Medalists at the 1997 Winter Universiade